Shuhrat Jabborov (born 30 November 1973) is a retired Tajikistan footballer who played as a forward.

Career statistics

International

Statistics accurate as of match played 11 September 2015

Honours
Regar-TadAZ
Tajik Cup (3): 2005, 2011, 2012

References

External links
 

1973 births
Living people
Tajikistani footballers
Tajikistani expatriate footballers
Tajikistan international footballers
Expatriate footballers in Uzbekistan
Tajikistani expatriate sportspeople in Uzbekistan
Footballers at the 1998 Asian Games
Place of birth missing (living people)
Association football forwards
Asian Games competitors for Tajikistan